Queen's Regulations and Orders may refer to

Queen's Regulations and Orders for the Canadian Forces
Queen's Regulations and Orders for the British Army of the United Kingdom